Gasteria is a genus of succulent plants, native to South Africa (and the far south-west corner of Namibia).

Naming
The genus is named for its stomach-shaped flowers ("gaster" is Latin for "stomach") that result from the swollen base on the  corolla. Common names include ox-tongue, cow-tongue, lawyer's tongue and, occasionally, mother-in-law's tongue.

Description

Gasterias are recognisable from their thick, hard, succulent "tongue-shaped" leaves. These are either in two opposite ranks (distichous), or in various distinctive spiral arrangements. Their inflorescence is also unique, with their curved, stomach-shaped flowers, which hang from inclined racemes.

Distribution

The species of this genus are mostly native to the Eastern Cape Province, South Africa, where the bulk of the species occur – especially in the small area between Makhanda and Uniondale which enjoys rainfall throughout the year. However distribution of several species extends widely across the low-altitude coastal regions of the country, in an arched horseshoe shape across South Africa. At the one end of the genus's distribution, a species Gasteria pillansii extends into the far south-west corner of Namibia. At the other end, a species reaches the Lebombo mountains of Eswatini.

Taxonomy

Gasteria is part of the family Asphodelaceae, subfamily Asphodeloideae. Closely related genera include Aloe and Haworthia, and the species of these genera are known to hybridise relatively easily with each other.

Dividing Gasteria into species is extremely difficult, as each plant can be highly variable. One plant will look different depending on its location, its soil and its age. Young Gasteria plants typically look entirely different from older specimens. (Usually, young plants have flat, strap-shaped, highly tubercled leaves, in a distichous formation.) 
In addition, the species tend to flow into each other in gradual transitions, with many intermediate forms, rather than being cleanly divided into discrete and separate species. Lastly, hybrids occur easily and naturally, whenever the range of two species overlap in habitat.

There is therefore considerable disagreement on how many species exist, with as many as 100 names being listed.

Taxonomy according to flower morphology
Using morphology (especially flower structure), a traditional and widely accepted taxonomy was described in 1994 (van Jaarsveld et al.), dividing the genus into 2 sections, 4 series, and 16 species. E. J. van Jaarsveld has revised the taxonomy since then and the most recent synoptic review was published in 2007. Several new species have been described in recent years, as well. Currently the number of accepted species is 29.

Section Longiflorae (2 series, 19 species) 
Series Longifoliae (6 species): 
Gasteria acinacifolia (J.Jacq.) Haw. – southern coast of Cape Province
Gasteria barbae van Jaarsv. – southern coast of Cape Province, between Knysna and Plettenberg Bay
Gasteria batesiana G.D.Rowley – Limpopo, Mpumalanga, KwaZulu-Natal 
G. batesiana var. batesiana G.D.Rowley
G. batesiana var. dolomitica van Jaarsv. & A.E.van Wyk – Mpumalanga
Gasteria croucheri Baker – south-east Cape Province to east KwaZulu-Natal
G. croucheri subsp. croucheri Baker – south-east Cape Province to East KwaZulu-Natal
G. croucheri subsp. pendulifolia (van Jaarsv.) Zonn. – KwaZulu-Natal
G. croucheri subsp. pondoensis N.R.Crouch, Gideon F.Sm. & D.Styles – south-east Cape Province
Gasteria loedolffiae van Jaarsv. – Eastern Cape
Gasteria tukhelensis van Jaarsv. – KwaZulu-Natal

Series Multifariae (13 species): 
Gasteria armstrongii Schönland – southern Cape Province
Gasteria carinata (Mill.) Duval – south-south-west Cape Province
G. carinata var. carinata (Mill.) Duval – Langeberg in Cape Province
G. carinata var. glabra (Salm-Dyck) van Jaarsv. – Mossel Bay to Gouritz River
G. carinata var. verrucosa (Mill) van Jaarsv. – Bredasdorp in Cape Province
Gasteria ellaphieae van Jaarsv. – Kouga Dam in Cape Province
Gasteria excelsa Baker – Transkei, Eastern Cape
Gasteria glauca van Jaarsv. – Kouga River Valley
Gasteria koenii van Jaarsv. – Swartberg
Gasteria langebergensis (van Jaarsv) van Jaarsv. & Zonn. – western Cape Province
Gasteria nitida  Haw. – southern Cape Province
Gasteria polita van Jaarsv. – Cape Province
Gasteria pulchra Haw. – Cape Province
Gasteria thunbergii N.E.Br. – near Herbertsdale in Cape Province
Gasteria visserii van Jaarsv. – Eastern Cape
Gasteria vlokii van Jaarsv. – Great Swartberg + Witteberg in Cape Province (a higher altitude species)

Section Gasteria (2 series, 10 species) 
Series Gasteria (9 species): 
Gasteria baylissiana Rauh – Suurberg Range in Cape Province
Gasteria bicolor Haw. – south-east Cape Province; naturalized in Mexico
G. bicolor var. bicolor Haw.
G. bicolor var. fallax (Haw.) van Jaarsv.
G. bicolor var. liliputana (Poelln.) van Jaarsv.
Gasteria brachyphylla (Salm-Dyck) van Jaarsv. – Little Karoo in Cape Province
G. brachyphylla var. brachyphylla (Salm-Dyck) van Jaarsv.
G. brachyphylla var. bayeri van Jaarsv. – Little Karoo in Cape Province
Gasteria camillae van Jaarsv. & Molteno – Baviaanskloof mountain range
Gasteria disticha (L.) Haw. – Robertson Karoo and surrounds, Western Cape  
G. disticha var. disticha (L.) Haw. – south-west and south-central Cape Province
G. disticha var. robusta van Jaarsv. – western Cape Province
Gasteria doreeniae van Jaarsv. & A.E.van Wyk – Cape Province
Gasteria glomerata van Jaarsv. – Kouga Dam in Cape Province
Gasteria rawlinsonii Oberm. – Baviaanskloof in Cape Province 
Gasteria retusa (van Jaarsv.) van Jaarsv. – Worcester & Heidelberg in Cape Province

Series Namaquana (1 species): 
Gasteria pillansii Kensit – Namibia, Cape Province
G. pillansii var. pillansii Kensit – western Cape Province
G. pillansii var. ernesti-ruschii (Dinter von Poellnitz) van Jaarsv. – south-west Namibia to north-west Cape Province (Richtersveld)
G. pillansii var. hallii van Jaarsv. – western Cape Province

Taxonomy according to genome
A phylogenetic study in 2005 suggest that the genus may be sub-divided into 5 groups with respect to an increasing pattern in DNA content and geographical distribution:

Group A
 Gasteria rawlinsonii (possibly a relict species; genetically an outlier, with the smallest genome) 
Group B - 8 rare and restricted inland species (possibly also relict species, with relatively small genomes): 
Gasteria armstrongii (separated from G. nitida here due to the difference in DNA content)
Gasteria polita
Gasteria glomerata
Gasteria pulchra
Gasteria ellaphieae
Gasteria vlokii
Gasteria glauca
Gasteria nitida
Group C - 5 widespread, distichous species, mainly from the west of southern Africa: 
Gasteria brachyphylla
Gasteria bicolor
Gasteria disticha
Gasteria baylissiana
Gasteria pillansii
Group D - 5 widespread, rosette-forming species, mainly large coastal species: 
Gasteria excelsa
Gasteria croucheri (including Gasteria pendulifolia) 
Gasteria acinacifolia
Gasteria carinata
Group E
Gasteria batesiana (most northerly species, with the largest genome)

Gallery for identification

Western distichous group
Species with distichous (two-ranked), strap-shaped leaves which are usually without keels.

Rare inland species

Large coastal group 
Species generally form rosettes, with leaves usually bearing marginiform keels.

Cultivation 
Gasteria species are grown in well-drained, sandy soils in light shade. The species can all be propagated by off-sets and cuttings (leaf cuttings can usually be rooted easily). They are also commonly propagated by seed. Germination usually occurs within 8 days but may take as long as one month depending on the species.

Flowering times vary between species, but is usually in the spring & summer. 
Those in the summer rainfall areas to the east, tend to always flower in spring to summer (October–January in South Africa) such as Gasteria batesiana, Gasteria croucheri & Gasteria acinacifolia. 
Those in the areas which receive rainfall all year, usually flower also in later summer (December–January) such as Gasteria excelsa, Gasteria nitida, Gasteria vlokii and Gasteria brachyphylla var. bayeri. Others in this region flower all year, but with a peak in the spring, such as Gasteria rawlinsonii, Gasteria bicolor & Gasteria carinata. 
The westernmost species vary in their flowering times, within the species. Gasteria pillansii in the far west, flowers in summer (December–January), except for its northernmost variety "var. ernesti-ruschii" which flowers in autumn (March–April). 
Gasteria disticha usually flowers in spring, but in the far north of its range near Beaufort West it flowers in December.

Gasteria species are prone to Fusarium root rot, if they are over-watered. 

The cultivar 'Little Warty'   is a recipient of the Royal Horticultural Society's Award of Garden Merit.

Several hybrids with species in other related genera have been created in cultivation, such as between Gasteria and Aloe (× Gasteraloe), and between Gasteria and Haworthia (×Gasterhaworthia).

References

External links 

The Encyclopedia of House Plants - Gasteria

 
Asphodelaceae genera
Flora of Southern Africa